Poveglia is a small island located between Venice and Lido in the Venetian Lagoon, of northern Italy. A small canal divides the island into two separate parts. The island first appears in the historical record in 421, and was populated until the residents fled warfare in 1379. For more than 100 years beginning in 1776, the island was used as a quarantine station for those suffering the plague and other diseases, and later as a mental hospital. The mental hospital closed in 1968, and the island has been vacant ever since. Because of its history, the island is frequently featured on paranormal shows.  

Visits to the island are prohibited, but various books and articles report on visits by writers and/or photographers. Believers in the paranormal have claimed that Poveglia is the most haunted island or the most haunted place in the world.

History
The island is first mentioned in chronicles of 421, when people from Padua and Este fled there to escape the barbarian invasions. In the 9th century the island's population began to grow, and in the following centuries its importance grew steadily, until it was governed by a dedicated Podestà. In 1379 Venice came under attack from the Genoan fleet; the people of Poveglia were moved to the Giudecca.

The island remained uninhabited in the subsequent centuries; in 1527 the doge offered the island to the Camaldolese monks, who refused the offer. From 1645 on, the Venetian government built five octagonal forts to protect and control the entrances to the lagoon. The Poveglia octagon is one of four that still survive.

In 1776 the island came under the jurisdiction of the Magistrato alla Sanità (Public Health Office), and became a check point for all goods and people coming to and going from Venice by ship. In 1793, there were several cases of the plague on two ships, and consequently the island was transformed into a temporary confinement station for the ill (lazaretto); this role became permanent in 1805, under the rule of Napoleon Bonaparte, who also had the old church of San Vitale destroyed; the old bell-tower was converted into a lighthouse. The lazaretto was closed in 1814.

The island was used as a quarantine station from 1793 until 1814. In 1922 the existing buildings were converted into an asylum for the mentally ill and later used as a nursing home/long-term care facility, until its closure in 1968. Afterwards, the island was briefly used for agriculture and then completely abandoned.

In 2014 the Italian state auctioned a 99-year lease of Poveglia, which would remain state property, to raise revenue, hoping that the buyer would redevelop the hospital into a luxury hotel. The highest bid was from Italian businessman Luigi Brugnaro, (€513,000); he planned to invest €20 million euros in a restoration plan. The lease did not proceed because his project was judged not to meet all the conditions. Other sources suggested that the deal was annulled because the bid was too low. Brugnaro initially fought the cancellation of the lease, but after he became mayor of Venice, he renounced any intentions to the island.

In 2015, a private group, Poveglia per Tutti, was hoping to raise €25–30 million for a new plan to include "a public park, a marina, a restaurant, a hostel [and] a study centre" according to The Telegraph. As of mid-2019, however, the island still sat vacant.

Buildings and structures
The surviving buildings on the island consist of a cavana, a church, a hospital, an asylum, a bell-tower and housing and administrative buildings for the staff. The bell-tower is the most visible structure on the island, and dates back to the 12th century. It belonged to the church of San Vitale, which was demolished in 1806. The tower was re-used as a lighthouse.

The existence of an asylum on Poveglia seems to be confirmed by a sign for "Reparto Psichiatria" (Psychiatric Department) still visible among the derelict buildings, as photographed by Ransom Riggs in his May 2010 photo-essay documenting his visit to Poveglia. However, there seems to be no evidence of an alleged prison.

A bridge connects the island on which the buildings stand with the island that was given over to trees and fields. The octagonal fort is on a third, separate island, next to the island with the buildings, but unconnected to it. The fort itself today consists solely of an earthen rampart faced on the outside with brick.

The island contains one or more plague pits. An estimate published by National Geographic suggest that over 100,000 people died on the island over the centuries and were buried in plague pits. Another source, Atlas Obscura, provides an estimate of 160,000 people.

News reports published in 2014/2015 confirmed that the building and rusting artefacts still existed. The island contained dilapidated buildings including the church of St Vitale, a hospital, an asylum, and prison plus residential and office buildings.

Popular culture
Some time after the island had become a quarantine station for ships arriving at Venice in the 18th century, a plague was discovered on two ships. The island was sealed off and used to host people with infectious diseases, leading to legends of terminally ill Venetians waiting to die before their ghosts returned to haunt the island.

A doctor allegedly experimented on patients with crude lobotomies. According to various reports, most recently by the Travel Channel, the doctor jumped from the bell tower in the 1930s after claiming he had been driven mad by ghosts. He later died. Decades later, nearby residents claimed to still hear the bell, although it was removed many years earlier. That report, titled "Haunted History", also states that some restoration work had started recently but that "abruptly stopped without explanation".

The island has been featured on the paranormal shows Ghost Adventures and Scariest Places on Earth.

The island was featured on a video by Yes Theory in 2019.

See also
Hoffman Island in the Lower New York Bay, off the South Beach of Staten Island, New York City
Swinburne Island an artificial island in Lower New York Bay, east of Staten Island in New York City

References

External links

 Poveglia Island Paranormal Report
 Poveglia island history, ghost sightings, photos of the abandoned structures
 Satellite image from Google Maps
 The Island of Poveglia Is a Classic Italian Horror Story - Horror World

Islands of the Venetian Lagoon
Reportedly haunted locations in Italy